Coalbrookdale by Night is an 1801 oil painting by Philip James de Loutherbourg.

The painting depicts the Madeley Wood (or Bedlam) Furnaces, which belonged to the Coalbrookdale Company from 1776 to 1796. The picture has come to symbolize the birth of the Industrial Revolution in the Ironbridge Gorge, Shropshire, England.  It is held in the collections of the Science Museum in London.

Loutherbourg undertook tours of England and Wales during 1786 and 1800, observing industrial activity at the time. Coalbrookdale by Night provides a view of the Bedlam Furnaces in Madeley Dale, downstream along the River Severn from the town of Ironbridge itself.

References

1801 paintings
1801 in England
Collections of the Science Museum, London
Coalbrookdale
Industrial Revolution
History of Shropshire
Paintings by Philip James de Loutherbourg